The 2009 Nebelhorn Trophy was held between September 23 and 26, 2009 in Oberstdorf, Germany. It served as the final Olympic qualifier to the 2010 Winter Olympics. Skaters competed in the disciplines of men's singles, ladies' singles, pair skating, and ice dance. The compulsory dance was the Tango Romantica.

Olympic qualification
This competition served as the final Olympic qualifier to the 2010 Winter Olympics. Eligible skaters qualified a spot to the Olympics for their country in order of their placement at this competition; there was no individual skater qualification. Countries who had already qualified a spot to the Olympics at the 2009 World Figure Skating Championships were not eligible to qualify more spots here, and their results were discounted from the overall results when allotting spots to countries. Unlike at the World Championships, where countries could qualify more than one spot depending on the placement of the skater, at this competition, countries who qualified were allotted only one spot to the Olympics, regardless of placement.

There were six Olympic spots available in men's singles, seven in ladies' singles, four in pairs, and five in ice dance. There were originally only six spots available in the ladies event; however, Georgia gave up one of its ladies spots before the competition, which allowed a seventh spot to become available.

If a country later declined to use one or more of its qualified spots, the vacated spot was awarded using the results of the Nebelhorn Trophy in descending order of placement.

Qualified countries
The following countries qualified an entry to the Olympics. In the event that a country chooses not to fill a spot, the next alternate in line is allotted the spot.

 Georgia, which had earned two spots in the ladies event at the World Championships, informed the ISU before the competition that they would not be filling their second spot. Therefore, Israel qualified an entrant here.

Schedule
(UTC+2)

24/09/2009
 09:45 Ice dance: Compulsory dance
 12:10 Men: Short program
 17:10 Pairs: Short program
 20:30 Ice dance: Original dance
25/09/2009
 08:30 Ladies: Short program
 13:50 Men: Free skating
 19:45 Pairs: Free skating
26/09/2009
 08:54 Ladies: Free skating
 15:00 Ice dance: Free dance

Results

Men

Ladies

Pairs

Ice dance

See also
 2005 Karl Schäfer Memorial, the final qualifying competition to the 2006 Winter Olympics

References

External links

 2009 Nebelhorn Trophy official site
 
 
 
 

Nebelhorn Trophy
Nebelhorn Trophy, 2009
2009 in German sport